Çamlıca TRT Television Tower was a communications tower in the Üsküdar district of Istanbul, Turkey, which was owned and operated by the state-owned Turkish Radio and Television Corporation (TRT). It was demolished in late 2020 after 48 years in service.

History
The tower went into service on 30 December 1972. On May 21, 2010, a fire broke out at the tower's   height. The fire caused damage to the transmitter, and the broadcasting was interrupted until the damage was removed.

Demolition
With the completion of the Küçük Çamlıca TV Radio Tower on the neighboring hill, the steel transmitter masts were all removed and integrated in the new towers. The tower was demolished in late 2020.

References

Communication towers in Turkey
Towers with revolving restaurants
Towers completed in 1976
1972 establishments in Turkey
Towers in Istanbul
Tourist attractions in Istanbul
Restaurants in Istanbul
Üsküdar
Demolished buildings and structures in Istanbul
Buildings and structures demolished in 2020